St. Paul's Lutheran Church, originally St. Paul's Episcopal Church, is a historic Lutheran church at 464 Main Street in Oak Hill, Greene County, New York.  The original section was built in 1843 and is a heavy timber frame rectangular  structure, three bays wide by four bays deep, in a conventional meeting house style.  In 1883, a light frame chancel addition was completed and it features a steeply pitched gable roof.

It was added to the National Register of Historic Places in 2005.

See also
National Register of Historic Places listings in Greene County, New York

References

Lutheran churches in New York (state)
Churches on the National Register of Historic Places in New York (state)
Carpenter Gothic church buildings in New York (state)
Churches completed in 1834
19th-century Lutheran churches in the United States
Churches in Greene County, New York
National Register of Historic Places in Greene County, New York